Amorbia effoetana is a species of moth of the family Tortricidae. It is found in Puerto Rico and Cuba.

References

Moths described in 1891
Sparganothini
Moths of the Caribbean